Hydetown is a borough in Crawford County, Pennsylvania, United States. The population was 530 at the 2020 census, up from 526 at the 2010 census, down from 605 in 2000. It was established in 1862.

Geography
Hydetown is located in eastern Crawford County at  (41.652312, -79.725872). It is surrounded by Oil Creek Township, a separate municipality. Pennsylvania Route 8 passes through the borough, leading southeast  to Titusville and north  to Centerville. Pennsylvania Route 408 leads west  to Townville.

Natural features
Hydetown Borough is located just south of the southern terminal moraine for glaciation in northwestern Pennsylvania. The borough is drained by Oil Creek, a southward-flowing tributary of the Allegheny River, which runs through the northwestern and southwestern sides of the borough and Thompson Creek, which enters from the northeast and joins the main creek southwest of the borough center. The lowest elevation in Hydetown is  where Oil Creek flows south out of the borough.

Demographics

As of the census of 2000, there were 605 people, 251 households, and 157 families residing in the borough. The population density was 279.0 people per square mile (107.6/km2). There were 264 housing units at an average density of 121.7 per square mile (47.0/km2). The racial makeup of the borough was 99.17% White and 0.83% Asian. Hispanic or Latino of any race were 0.66% of the population.

There were 251 households, out of which 24.7% had children under the age of 18 living with them, 53.8% were married couples living together, 4.4% had a female householder with no husband present, and 37.1% were non-families. 30.3% of all households were made up of individuals, and 14.7% had someone living alone who was 65 years of age or older. The average household size was 2.41 and the average family size was 3.04.

In the borough the population was spread out, with 23.1% under the age of 18, 8.4% from 18 to 24, 23.6% from 25 to 44, 26.4% from 45 to 64, and 18.3% who were 65 years of age or older. The median age was 42 years. For every 100 females there were 106.5 males. For every 100 females age 18 and over, there were 100.4 males.

The median income for a household in the borough was $34,563, and the median income for a family was $42,188. Males had a median income of $26,389 versus $17,417 for females. The per capita income for the borough was $14,891. About 5.0% of families and 12.8% of the population were below the poverty line, including 19.1% of those under age 18 and 15.1% of those age 65 or over.

Education

Hydetown is part of the Titusville Area School District.

References

Populated places established in 1862
Boroughs in Crawford County, Pennsylvania
1862 establishments in Pennsylvania